Minna is a city in west central Nigeria.

Minna may also refer to:

People
 Minna (given name)
 Maria Minna (born 1948), Canadian politician

Other uses
Minna von Barnhelm, a 1767 play by Gotthold Ephraim Lessing
Minna Bluff, a rocky promontory in Antarctica
Minna Airport, Nigeria
Minna Shopping Center, a shopping mall in Kuopio, Finland
, a Swedish cargo ship in service 1922–39
 Minna-Dietlinde Wilcke, a character in the anime Strike Witches
 Minna Häkkinen, a recurring character on the television series Veep
 MPV Minna, a Marine Protection Vessel of the Scottish Government

See also
Mina (disambiguation)